Kasey Rogers (born Josie Imogene Rogers; December 15, 1925 – July 6, 2006) was an American actress, memoirist and writer, best known for playing the second Louise Tate in the popular U.S. television sitcom Bewitched.

Life and career
Rogers was born Josie Imogene Rogers in Morehouse, Missouri, the daughter of Ina Mae (Mocabee) and Eben E. Rogers. She moved with her family to California at the age of two. As a child, her prowess at the game of baseball led her friends to nickname her Casey (after the famous poem "Casey at the Bat"). While under contract to Paramount, she used the stage name Laura Elliot. In 1955, she began working with a press agent in Hollywood, Walter Winslow Lewis III (aka "Bud"). It was Bud who suggested that she use the nickname with her maiden name and changed the "C" to a "K". They later married and had four children.

Rogers began work under the names Laura Elliott and Laura Elliot for Paramount Pictures. She appeared in movies such as Special Agent, Samson and Delilah, Silver City, Paid in Full, Two Lost Worlds, and, in perhaps her best-known film role, Alfred Hitchcock's Strangers on a Train, playing Miriam, the scheming, adulterous wife of Guy Haines (Farley Granger).

In the mid-1950s, Rogers began working on television.  She guest-starred on various series, such as Sergeant Preston, Stage 7, The Restless Gun, The Lone Ranger, Bat Masterson,  Maverick, Yancy Derringer, Perry Mason, as Francie Keene in the Wanted: Dead or Alive episode "Railroaded", and many other programs. In 1964 she landed a starring role on Peyton Place, portraying the character Julie Anderson, the mother of Betty Anderson (Barbara Parkins). She left the series in 1966 to replace Irene Vernon in the role of Louise Tate on Bewitched. In 1972, she performed as Louise Tate for the final time in the episode "Serena's Youth Pill". She then retired from acting, appearing in only a few guest television spots and making appearances on the Bewitched edition of E! True Hollywood Story.

A Democrat, she supported the campaign of Adlai Stevenson during the 1952 presidential election. She was a Presbyterian.

Death
After battling throat cancer for many years, Rogers went into cardiac arrest. She then suffered a stroke and died in Los Angeles, California, on July 6, 2006, aged 80. She was buried at the Forest Lawn, Hollywood Hills Cemetery in Los Angeles.

Other achievements
In the 1970s, she became involved with motorcycles after her son began riding and then racing at the age of nine. Rogers became involved in the world of motocross racing. She worked closely with the AMA and established PURR ("PowderPuffs Unlimited Riders and Racers"), an association that brought women into the male-dominated sport, in 1974. PURR would later evolve into what is now the Women's Pro-Class division.

Books
Rogers wrote five books with Mark Wood. The first was The Bewitched Cookbook: Magic in the Kitchen (1996), a cookbook based on the television series Bewitched with the foreword written by Rogers' co-star and friend Sandra Gould.  Her other books are Halloween Crafts: Eerily Elegant Décor (2001), Character Wreaths: Holiday Projects for Year 'Round Decor (2002), Decorating for Christmas (2003), and Create a Bewitched Falloween: 55 Projects for Decorating and Entertaining (2003).  Rogers and Wood filmed an unaired pilot for a proposed how-to craft series, Hands on Holidays. The pilot was released on DVD in 2006.

In 2013, Bewitched and Beyond: The Fan Who Came to Dinner by Mark Wood (with Eddie Lucas) was published by BearManor Media, a book that recounts Wood's friendship with Rogers. The title of Charles Tranberg's biography of Agnes Moorehead, I Love the Illusion, derives from Rogers' recounting how Moorehead used this expression when asked about acting.

Partial filmography

Special Agent (1949) - Lucille Peters
Top o' the Morning (1949) - Larkin's Secretary
Chicago Deadline (1949) - Marcia Grantland (uncredited)
Samson and Delilah (1949) - Spectator
The File on Thelma Jordon (1950) - Dolly - Cleve's Secretary
Paid in Full (1950) - Tina, Bridesmaid
Girls' School (1950) - Lucille Farnsworth
No Man of Her Own (1950) - Friend of the Family (uncredited)
Riding High (1950) - Spectator (uncredited)
Union Station (1950) - Jenny - Clerk (uncredited)
Dark City (1950) - Stewardess (uncredited)
Two Lost Worlds (1951) - Elaine Jeffries
The Mating Season (1951) - Bridesmaid / Party Guest (uncredited)
A Place in the Sun (1951) - Miss Harper (uncredited)
Strangers on a Train (1951) - Miriam Joyce Haines
When Worlds Collide (1951) - Stewardess (uncredited)
Here Comes the Groom (1951) - Maid (uncredited)
Silver City (1951) - Josephine
My Favorite Spy (1951) - Maria (uncredited)
Something to Live For (1952) - Actress at Audition (uncredited)
Denver and Rio Grande (1952) - Linda Prescott
Jamaica Run (1953) - Janice Clayton
The French Line (1953) - Katherine 'Katy' Hodges
About Mrs. Leslie (1954) - Felice
The McConnell Story (1955) - Claire (uncredited)
Yancy Derringer (1958) - Black-eyed Susan
Wanted Dead or Alive (1959) -- episode entitled "Railroaded"
The Gunfight at Dodge City (1959) - Molly Day (uncredited)
The Restless Gun (1959) - Episode "A Trial for Jenny May"
Ask Any Girl (1959) - Girl in Tub (uncredited)
Perry Mason (1960, TV Series) - Lois Langely, Irate Inventor s3e25
Bat Masterson (1960) - Dixie Mayhew /Francine Wallace
The Naked Flame (1964) - Elena
Bewitched (1966-1972, TV Series) - The 2nd Mrs Louise Tate

References

External links

 
 
 autographed portrait(archived)

1925 births
2006 deaths
Actresses from Missouri
American film actresses
American television actresses
Burials at Forest Lawn Memorial Park (Hollywood Hills)
Deaths from esophageal cancer
People from New Madrid County, Missouri
People from Missouri
Writers from Missouri
Missouri Democrats
California Democrats
American Presbyterians
20th-century American actresses
21st-century American women